Embassy of Sweden in Athens is the diplomatic mission of Sweden in Greece.

Buildings

Chancery
In the 1940s, the embassy was located at Rue Patriarchou Ioakim 20 in Athens. In the early 1960s, the embassy had moved to Rue Stissichorou 15. In 1964, the embassy moved to Rue Meleagrou. By the early 1970s, the embassy had moved to Boulevard Vassileos Konstantinou.

, the Swedish Embassy's premises are located at Vassileos Konstantinou 7, at the top of the fifth floor of a building built in 1977. The building also houses the embassies of the Netherlands and Ireland. Across the street is the Panathenaic Stadium from 1896, the year the first modern Olympic Games took place. The Swedish Embassy moved in during 1979 and in connection with that the office was rebuilt. Ten years later, in 1989, a thorough renovation and installation of a new reception, security lock and interview room was carried out. In 2003, the embassy's premises were renovated and a new heating and cooling system was installed. In 2012, a new elevator was installed.

Residence
From the 1950s, the residence was located at Rue Meleagrou 5. In the early 1960s, the residence had moved to No 1 Rue Roi Georges II. By the early 1970s, the residence was located at Rue Meleagrou 4.

The landlord of the previously rented Swedish ambassadoral residence sold the house and the new owner did not want to rent it out. A suitable replacement property was found in the Filothei district, located on the slope northeast of the city center overlooking Athens and Mount Pentelicus. The district is a quiet residential area and several countries have relocated their ambassadoral residences here. The ambassador's residence was built and purchased in 1989. The architect's name is Stelios Agiostatitis.

The ambassador's residence is a detached earth shelter villa in two floors and a basement. Both exterior and interior are white, the latter with white marble floors and white painted walls. There are glass walls facing the valley. The entrance is on the street level, as is the representation floor with study, lounge, dining room and kitchen. Outside the dining room and lounge is a large terrace of about 120 sqm. On the ambassador's private floor, there are five bedrooms, a living room, four bathrooms and two smaller terraces. Recreation room, storage rooms and rooms for service staff are located in the basement. There is also a garage. The property has a walled raised plot of 1,200 sqm. In the garden there is a solar heated pool.

Heads of Mission

References

External links
 Embassy of Sweden in Athens

Athens
Greece–Sweden relations
Sweden